El Playón may refer to:

 El Playón, Santander, a municipality in Colombia
 El Playón, Venezuela